Anthony Di Pietro (born 15 February 1969) is a businessman from Melbourne, Australia. Di Pietro is most known for his current and longest standing chairmanship of Melbourne Victory FC. Alongside sport, Di Pietro is also the Chief Executive Officer and a board member of industry leading fruit & vegetable producers and marketers, Premier Fresh Australia.

Early life and education 
Di Pietro is a University of Melbourne alumni holding a Bachelor of Commerce degree and has delivered the occasional address to the graduating students in the university's Business and Economics faculty.

Agribusiness
Di Pietro is Group CEO of Premier Fresh Australia.

The company's farming and marketing enterprises cover all major Australian markets. It has farming operations in Queensland, the Northern Territory, South Australia, and Goulburn Valley Victoria.

Di Pietro voiced his advocacy for an 'Australian-led Asian food boom' and was a key participant in the Victorian Government's 2013 Food Trade initiatives into Asia.

Melbourne Victory FC

Di Pietro was appointed to the Board of Melbourne Victory FC in 2006 during its formative years and became chairman in January 2011. Di Pietro oversaw a number of key achievements, including 2017–18 Championship, making Melbourne Victory FC one of the most successful clubs in A-League history, having won three Premiership and four Championship titles, as well as winning the Australia Cup titles in 2015 and 2021.

Di Pietro oversaw the visit of English Premier League heavyweight Liverpool F.C. to Melbourne in July 2013. The game attracted a record crowd for a football (soccer) match of 95,446 people at the Melbourne Cricket Ground.

In April 2021, Di Pietro announced Asian Champions League winning coach Tony Popovic as A-League head coach.

In July 2022 Melbourne Victory FC signed Luis Nani, an ex-Manchester United star player on a 2-year deal.

References

1969 births
Living people
A-League Men executives
Businesspeople from Melbourne
Australian people of Italian descent
Australian chief executives
University of Melbourne alumni
Australian people of Calabrian descent
Australian soccer chairmen and investors
Australian corporate directors
Melbourne Victory FC chairmen
Founders of association football institutions
Directors of Melbourne Victory FC
People from Frankston, Victoria